Dachverband Schweizerischer Gemeinnütziger Frauen (SGF) formerly known as Schweizerischen Gemeinnützigen Frauenverein (SGF), is a women's organization in Switzerland, founded in 1888.

The organization was founded by Emma Boos-Jegher, Emma Coradi-Stahl and Rosina Gschwind-Hofer, who had left the Schweizer Frauen-Verband. It became the first permanent, national umbrella organization for the Swiss women's movement.

References 

1888 establishments in Switzerland
Feminism and history
Feminist organisations in Switzerland
Organizations established in 1888
Social history of Switzerland
Voter rights and suffrage organizations
Women's suffrage in Switzerland